Soldati e caporali (translation: Soldiers and Corporals) is a 1965 Italian "musicarello" comedy military film directed by Mario Amendola starring the comic duo Franco and Ciccio.

Cast
Franco Franchi	as	Franco
Ciccio Ingrassia	as	Ciccio 
Didi Perego	as	Assunta
Franco Giacobini	as	Serg. Pancani
Umberto D'Orsi	as	Alfredo Brambilla
Mario Pisu	as	Colonel Rigamonti
Gabriele Antonini	as	Federico Giustini
Vittorio Congia	as	Mario
Stelvio Rosi		as 	Gino Zangheri
Paola Pitti		as	Claretta
Gioia Ferrari		as	Laura
Daniela Surina		as 	Lidia
Pietro De Vico		as	Nicola Cacace
Enzo Garinei		as 	Il Caporale
Gino Buzzanca		as	Maresciallo Luigi Donatone
Tony Renis		as	himself

External links
 

1965 films
1960s Italian-language films
1965 musical comedy films
Military humor in film
Films directed by Mario Amendola
Italian buddy comedy films
1960s buddy comedy films
Italian musical comedy films
1960s Italian films
Musicarelli